The Apostle of Vengeance is a 1916 American silent drama film directed by Clifford Smith and starring William S. Hart, Nona Thomas, and John Gilbert. A Kentucky-born preacher returns home from Vermont in order to settle a feud between two warring families.

Cast
 William S. Hart as David Hudson 
 Nona Thomas as Mary McCoy 
 Joseph J. Dowling as Tom McCoy 
 Fanny Midgley as 'Marm' Hudson 
 John Gilbert as Willie Hudson
 Marvel Stafford as Elsie Hudson 
 Gertrude Claire

References

Bibliography
 Donald W. McCaffrey & Christopher P. Jacobs. Guide to the Silent Years of American Cinema. Greenwood Publishing, 1999.

External links
 

1916 films
1916 drama films
1910s English-language films
American silent feature films
Silent American drama films
Films directed by Clifford Smith
American black-and-white films
Triangle Film Corporation films
Films set in Kentucky
1916 lost films
Lost drama films
1910s American films